The 2016 Imphal earthquake struck northeast India in the state of Manipur on January 4 with a moment magnitude of 6.7 and a maximum Mercalli intensity of VII (Very strong). Its epicentre was located in the Tamenglong district; about 30 km
west of Imphal. At least 11 people were killed, 200 others were injured and numerous buildings were damaged. The quake was also strongly felt in Bangladesh. It was also extensively felt in eastern and north-eastern India. The earthquake, which hit at 4:35 a.m. on 4 January local time (23:05 UTC, 3 January), was centered in an isolated area. Imphal has a population of more than 250,000. It was one of the most damaging earthquakes in Manipur since 1880 and 1939.

See also
 Indian Plate
 List of earthquakes in 2016
 List of earthquakes in India
 Thrust tectonics

References

External links
 Recent Earthquakes Near Manipur, India
 

Imphal
2016 earthquakes
2016 in Bangladesh
2016 disasters in India
2016 in Nepal
Earthquakes in Bangladesh
Earthquakes in India
Earthquakes in Nepal
January 2016 events in Asia
Disasters in Manipur
Earthquakes in Myanmar
January 2016 events in India
January 2016 events in Bangladesh
2016 disasters in Asia